Oakland is an unincorporated community in Mason County, in the U.S. state of Washington.

History
A post office called Oakland was established in 1858, and remained in operation until 1889. The community was named for a grove of oak trees near the original town site.

References

Unincorporated communities in Mason County, Washington
Unincorporated communities in Washington (state)